Sanjeev Tyagi (born 29 June 1971) is an Indian television and film actor, known for his role of police inspector in Crime Patrol at Sony TV. He appeared in most of the Crime Patrol's episodes. He appeared in Akshay Kumar's Baby and played the role of D. Mishra in Hanak, movie based on Vikas Dubey's life. He is joined for women and child safety.

Career 
Tyagi started his career from DD National Shows.  From 2011 through 2021, and starting again in 2022, he played Abhimanyu Jindal, an angry police inspector in Crime Patrol.

Filmography

Films

Television

Web series

Theatre

References

External links 

 
 
 

Living people
21st-century Indian male actors
Indian male television actors
Indian male film actors
1971 births

Chaudhary Charan Singh University alumni